Elton is a ghost town in Custer County, Nebraska, United States.

History
A post office was established at Elton in 1879, and remained in operation until it was discontinued in 1916. It was named after Elton, New York.

References

Geography of Custer County, Nebraska